The Victualling Department  originally known as the Department of the Comptroller of Victualling and Transport Services or the Victualling Office, also known as the Department of the Director of Victualling was the British Admiralty department responsible for civil administration of Victualling Yards and the storing and supply of Naval Victuals for the Royal Navy from 1832 to 1964.

History
The provision of Victualling to the Royal Navy was originally done using specialist food and beverage subcontractors, it became the responsibility of the Surveyor-General of Victuals, who was a principal officer of the Navy Board from 1550 to 1679. In 1683, he was post replaced by a Board of Victualling Commissioners that was subordinate yet autonomous to the Navy Board. The Victualling Board took over a number of functions, including medical services, from the Transport Board when it was abolished in 1817. When the Victualling Board itself was also discharged from its duties in the Admiralty reforms of 1832, victualling became the responsibility of the Board of Admiralty under a new Comptroller of Victualling and Transport Services, under the superintendence of the Fourth Naval Lord. In 1862  the provision transport services passed to a newly created Transport Department and in 1869 the office of Comptroller of Victualling  and his department was ended. Its former role was then divided between a new Contract and Purchase Department, that would managed by the Parliamentary and Financial Secretary to the Admiralty, their department became responsible for purchasing, following this re-organisation process a Superintendent of Victualling was created in 1870 until 1878 when it was renamed the Director of Victualling his department managed the store-keeping and supply functions of Navy Victuals for the Royal Navy. In 1961 the department was amalgamated within the Naval Stores Department but remained autonomous until 1964. Victualling continued within the new Navy Department, Ministry of Defence that was created following the merger of the Department of Admiralty in April 1964 into an enlarged ministry.

Administration
Post Holders included:

Comptrollers of Victualling and Transport Services
 Captain Jame Meek, June 1832 - December 1850
 Thomas Tassell Grant, F.R.S. December 1850 - May 1858
 Charles Richards, Paym, May 1858 - 1862

Comptroller of Victualling
 Charles Richards, Paym, 1862 - April 1870

Superintendents of Victualling and Stores
 Sir Samuel Sayer Lewes, Kt, April 1870 - August 1878

Directors of Victualling
 Sir Samuel Sayer Lewes, Kt, August 1878 - February 1886
 Sir Henry Francis Redhead Torke, February 1886 - December 1905
 Sir Oswyn Alexander Ruthven Murray, December 1905 - October 1911
 James Henry Brooks, October 1911 - 1918
 C. R. B. Lane,  February 1939 - June 1944
 Oscar Stanley Norman Rickards, June 1944 - November 1948
 R. H. Shipway Esq. January 1958 - June 1968
 A. W. Holden, June 1968 - May 1970

Structure of Department
As of Spring 1962 
Victualling Yards operating from 1860 onward during the existence of this department the number of yards were reduced and included.
Director of Victualling----------Deputy Director of Victualling--------Assistant Director of Victualling
Victualling Yards
Antigua Yard.
Ascension Yard.
Bermuda Yard.
Bombay Yard.
Chatham Yard.
Colombo Yard.
Deptford Yard.
Devonport Yard.
Devonport Yard, NZ.
Esquimalt, Yard.
Gibraltar Yard.
Halifax Yard.
Haulbowline Yard.
Invergordon Yard.
Jamaica Yard.
Lyness Yard.
Madras Yard.
Malta Yard.
Pembroke Yard.
Plymouth Yard.
Portland Yard.
Portsmouth Yard.
Rosyth Yard.
Scapa Flow Yard.
Sheerness Yard.
Simonstown Yard.
Singapore Yard.
Sydney Yard.
Trincomalee Yard.
Wei Hai Wei Yard.
Woolwich Yard.
Note:Each yard's victualling supplies were managed by either an Agent Victualler, Master Attendant Victualling, Victualling Contractor or Victualling Stores Officer.

Victualling Stores 
Harnley Road, Chandler's Ford.
Lumb Mill, Delph.
Roche Court, Fareham.
Botley, Winchester.

Timeline
Included
 Navy Board, Surveyor-General of Victuals, 1550-1679
 Navy Board, Victualling Board (Board of Victualling Commissioners), 1683-1832
 Board of Admiralty, Comptroller of Victualling and Transport Services, 1832-1862
 Board of Admiralty, Comptroller of Victualling, 1862-1869
 Board of Admiralty, Victualling Department, Superintendent of Victualling, 1869-1878
 Board of Admiralty, Victualling Department, Director of Victualling, Stores 1869-1964

References

Sources
  Archives, The National. "Records of Victualling Departments". discovery.nationalarchives.gov.uk. National Archives, 1660-1975, ADM 312.
 Clowes, W. Laird (William Laird); Markham, Clements R. (Clements Robert) (1897). The Royal Navy : a history from the earliest times to the present, Vol's 1-7, 55-1900. Sampson Low, Marston, London, England. 
 Government H.M. "The Navy List" (various 1832 to 1970), H.M. Stationery Office. London. England
 Hamilton, Sir Vesey (1896). "IV". The Constitution, Character and Functions of the Board of Admiralty and the Civil Departments it Directs. George Bell and Sons. .
 Haas, J. M. (1994). A Management Odyssey: The Royal Dockyards, 1714-1914. University Press of America. .
 Rodger, N.A.M. (1979). The Admiralty. Offices of State. Lavenham: T. Dalton. .

External links

Admiralty departments
Admiralty during World War I
Admiralty during World War II
Royal Navy
1832 establishments in the United Kingdom
1964 disestablishments in the United Kingdom